Leif Arne Heløe (born 8 August 1932) is a Norwegian politician for the Conservative Party. He was the Norwegian Minister of Social Affairs from 1981-1986. He also served as the County Governor of Troms county from 1991 until 2000.

Heløe was born in Harstad in Troms county, and he was a dentist before launching his political career.

References

1932 births
Living people
People from Harstad
Conservative Party (Norway) politicians
Government ministers of Norway
Mayors of Harstad
County governors of Norway